James Essex Elam (1829–1873) was Mayor of Baton Rouge, Louisiana, serving four terms between 1858 and his death in 1873.

Early life
Elam, the son of James M. Elam and Rebecca Chambers, was born in Baton Rouge on December 7, 1829.  He attended Lagrange College in Kentucky (1846-1847) and graduated from Centenary College in Jackson, Louisiana in 1850.  Elam graduated from law school at the University of Louisiana (now Tulane University) in New Orleans. Elam then returned to Baton Rouge to practice law with his father.  He married Mary E. Vanlandingham on April 20, 1860 and they had four sons and a daughter.

Political career
After practicing law with his father until his death in 1856, Elam ran for Mayor in 1858 and was elected at the age of 29.  He served from 1858 - 1862.  He was again elected mayor in 1865 and served until 1869.  In 1870, he was again elected mayor as a Democrat and served until his death in 1873.  In all, he served 4 terms as mayor.

Death and burial
Elam died on July 31, 1873 while serving his fourth non-consecutive term as Mayor of Baton Rouge.  It was reported that "he enjoyed the respect of every individual in the community during his long public career"  He was interred in the family plot in the Magnolia Cemetery in Baton Rouge.

References

1829 births
1873 deaths
Centenary College of Louisiana alumni
Tulane University Law School alumni
LaGrange College alumni
Mayors of Baton Rouge, Louisiana
Louisiana Democrats
19th-century American politicians